is generic term for eighteen Jōdo-shū temples located in Kantō region that were recognized as  by Tokugawa shogunate.

In the early Edo period Chion-in was considered to be one of the most notable temples of Jōdo-shū, though, its official status in the religious sect remained unclear. The management system of the sect was established, in which Chion-in was recognized as Monzeki and Zōjō-ji as Sōroku-jo. Kantō Jūhachi Danrin were designated under the law, and it was also stipulated that important issues regarding the sect were to be discussed at the meeting of danrin and that the priests were to be trained only at danrin.

List of Kantō Jūhachi Danrin
All of eighteen temples that were recognized as Kantō Jūhachi Danrin are listed below.

Musashi Province
 Zōjō-ji (Minato, Tokyo)
  (Bunkyo, Tokyo)
  (Kōtō, Tokyo)
  (Sumida, Tokyo)
  (Koganei, Tokyo) 
 Renkei-ji (Kawagoe, Saitama)
  (Konosu, Saitama)
  (Hachioji, Tokyo)
  (Iwatsuki-ku, Saitama)

Sagami Province
 Kōmyō-ji (Kamakura, Kanagawa)

Shimōsa Province
  (Yuki, Ibaraki)
  (Matsudo, Chiba)
  (Chiba, Chiba)
  (Joso, Ibaraki)

Kōzuke Province
  (Ota, Gunma)
  (Tatebayashi, Gunma)

Hitachi Province
  (Naka, Ibaraki)
  (Inashiki, Ibaraki)

See also 
 
 Jōdo-shū

Notes

Reference

Jōdo-shū
Buddhism in the Edo period